is a Japanese table tennis player.

Achievements

ITTF Tours
Women's doubles

References

2004 births
Japanese female table tennis players
Living people
Sportspeople from Fukui Prefecture
People from Ōno, Fukui